Oreomylodon is an extinct genus of ground sloth in the family Mylodontidae, endemic to Ecuador during the Pleistocene. The only species, O. wegneri, was long considered to be either a species or subgenus of Glossotherium (as G. wegneri) or a junior synonym of Glossotherium robustum, but studies of its cranial anatomy published in 2019 have supported Oreomylodon as a valid genus, and suggested it is more closely related to Paramylodon. However, a subsequent analysis published in 2020 again sunk Oreomylodon wegneri into Glossotherium, as a distinct species. It shows adaptations to living in a high-altitude habitat, and its fossils have frequently been unearthed in the Interandean Valles of Ecuador, at elevations of between 2,450 and 3,100 meters.

References

Prehistoric sloths
Prehistoric placental genera
Pleistocene xenarthrans
Pleistocene mammals of South America
Lujanian
Fossils of Ecuador
Fossil taxa described in 1949

Nomina dubia